The Devil Came on Horseback is a documentary film by Ricki Stern and Anne Sundberg illustrating the continuing Darfur Conflict in Sudan. Based on the book by former U.S. Marine Captain Brian Steidle and his experiences while working for the African Union. The film asks viewers to become educated about the ongoing genocide in Darfur and laments the failure of the US and others to end the crisis.

Details
It is a Break Thru Films production in association with Global Grassroots and 3 Generations.

It premiered at Sundance Film Festival in 2007, was screened at the Laemmle Music Hall on Wilshire Blvd. in Los Angeles in June 2007 and opened its nationwide release at the IFC New York in July 2007. It was released on DVD on 30 October 2007.

Awards
Index on Censorship Film Award, Freedom of Expression Award 2009, Index on Censorship.

Book
The book version is by Brian Steidle with his sister, Gretchen Steidle Wallace.

References

External links 
 

2007 films
Documentary films alleging war crimes
Documentary films about the War in Darfur
2007 documentary films
American documentary films
Films about the United States Marine Corps
Films directed by Ricki Stern and Anne Sundberg
2000s English-language films
2000s American films